Olga Timofeeva (Russian: Ольга Викторовна Тимофеева) (born 19 August 1977, Stavropol, Stavropol Krai, RSFSR, USSR) is a deputy for the United Russia party in the 7th State Duma of the Russian Federation and former journalist. 
She is Deputy chairman of the State Duma since 9 October 2017. Previously she was head of the Ecology and Environmental Protection committee. Honorary citizen of the city of  Stavropol (2014).

Deputy State Duma convocation VI and convocation VII, a member of the All-Russia People's Front. The State Duma represents the Stavropol territory.

Chairman of the Committee state Duma of the Federal Assembly of the Russian Federation on ecology and environmental protection from 5 October 2016 to 9 October 2017. Deputy city Duma Stavropol from 12 October 2008 to 22 May 2012.

Biography

Education 
 1999 – faculty of law, Stavropol state University, specialty "lawyer"; 
 2000 – faculty of Finance and credit of Stavropol state agricultural Academy, specialty "Finance and credit";
 2004 – faculty of professional retraining at the Moscow aviation Institute (State technical University) under the Presidential program of managerial personnel, specialty "management".

The work of a journalist 
Since 1996 works at Stavropol television: TV channel ATV, then "REN TV-Stavropol" (closed from 1 November 2015).

Since 18 years has passed all stages of the profession — TV journalist, editor, producer, host of programs. She received additional professional education at the school of journalism "Internews".

Author and host of the program "Time to talk". Work experience on the air — more than 15 years.

In 2007 Olga Timofeeva became the winner of the all-Russian television competition TEFI — region" in the nomination "Best interviewer". Member Union of journalists of Russia.

Since 2010 member of Academy of Russian television.

Deputy of Stavropol city Duma 
In 2008, she won the election of deputies of the Stavropol city Duma, headed the Committee on information policy, interaction with public and veteran organizations. In March 2011, for the second time confirmed the powers of the Deputy, winning the elections of the Stavropol city Duma of the 6th convocation.

The Deputy of the State Duma 
Since 22 May 2012 is a Deputy state Duma of the Russian Federation of the 6th convocation, member of the Committee of the state Duma on information policy, information technologies and communication.

From 2013 to 2018 – co-Chairman of the Central Staff of the Russian popular front.

In 2013 she was awarded the medal "For services to the city of Stavropol".

In 2014 he was awarded the title of "Honorary citizen of the city of Stavropol."

In 2016 she was awarded the medal of the order of merit for the Fatherland of the II degree.

Together with Dmitry Kharatyan on 18 March 2015, she conducted a concert on red square – Sevastopol-Crimea-Russia.

In 2016, following the results of United Russia preliminary voting, she took 1st place (68.23% of votes) in the regional part of the party list.

18 September 2016 re-elected to the State Duma of Russia of the 7th convocation, Chairman of the State Duma Committee on ecology and the environment.

Awarded a special award Ryan "For merits in development of science and economy of Russia" (2017).

Since 9 October 2017 he is the Vice-speaker of the state Duma.

Olga Timofeeva did not take part in the vote on pension reform, as stated by the parliamentarian herself, at the time of voting, she was on a business trip.

11 December 2018 was awarded the Order of Merit.

On 20 December 2018 she was awarded "for active legislative work", certificate of Honor of the Government of the Russian Federation. The award was presented at the Prime Minister of the Russian Federation Dmitry Medvedev in the boardroom of the state Duma of the Russian Federation.

Legislation 
From 2012 to 2019, during the execution of the powers of the state Duma Deputy of VI and VII convocations, she co-authored 40 legislative initiatives and amendments to the draft Federal laws.

References

21st-century Russian politicians
Living people
United Russia politicians
Russian women in politics
People from Stavropol
Russian journalists
1977 births
Sixth convocation members of the State Duma (Russian Federation)
Seventh convocation members of the State Duma (Russian Federation)
Eighth convocation members of the State Duma (Russian Federation)
21st-century Russian women politicians